"Lil Darlin" (copyrighted in 1958 as "Lil' Darlin") is a jazz standard, composed and arranged in 1957 by Neal Hefti for the Count Basie Orchestra and first recorded on the 1958 album, The Atomic Mr. Basie (Roulette Records).

Style 
The composition, in the words of jazz writer, Donald Clarke, is "an object lesson in how to swing at a slow tempo."

Gary Giddins expands on the importance of tempo in the performance of 'Lil' Darlin,' saying that "in the enduring 'Lil Darlin', [Hefti] tested the band's temporal mastery with a slow and simple theme that dies if it isn't played at exactly the right tempo. Basie never flinched." Hefti envisioned the piece to be played at a medium swing tempo, not as a ballad.

History 
The Jazz Discography (online), as of June 24, 2019, lists 324 recordings of the work.

With lyrics added 
Around 1958, Jon Hendricks wrote and arranged lyrics to "Li'l Darlin'" and his vocal trio, Lambert, Hendricks & Ross, performed it with Basie on May 26, 1958, in a New York studio (Roulette, initially, unissued; session No. 13064). In 1963, Mel Torme sang "Li'l Darlin'" with the Basie Band on The Judy Garland Show. Ella Fitzgerald recorded "Li'l Darlin'" as "Don't Dream of Anybody But Me"" on her 1971 album, Things Ain't What They Used to Be. Vocalist Mark Murphy recorded it in 1961, as did Hendricks & Company in 1982, and vocalist Kurt Elling in 2001.

Big band, combos, and solosits 
"Lil Darlin" rapidly became small-group and solo instrument standard. Notable guitarists to record the piece include Joe Pass, Charlie Byrd, George Benson, Tal Farlow, Barney Kessel, Kenny Burrell, Howard Alden, George Van Eps and Howard Roberts.  Pass performed it live at the Montreux Jazz Festival in 1979. Martin Taylor published his arrangement of the piece in a 2000 issue of Guitar Techniques.

TV and videography 
The Basie arrangement without lyrics was often used as the closing theme for The Tonight Show Starring Johnny Carson.

Filmography 
 1995: Mighty Aphrodite from Basie's original 1958 Atomic album

Influence 
"Sweetie Pie" – composed and arranged by Don Sebesky and recorded March 1962 as "Easy Chair" on Maynard Ferguson's Maynard '64 (Roulette ) – has been described by its publisher, Sierra Music Publications, as "Li'l Darliln'-ish," owed its similarity as a swing ballad. (audio)

Selected discography

References

Further reading 
 "Freddie Green: A Musical Analysis of the Guitar in the Count Basie Rhythm Section" (masters thesis), by Matt G. Buttermann, William Paterson University, May 2009

1957 compositions
1950s jazz standards
Jazz compositions in C major
Count Basie
Songs with music by Neal Hefti
Songs with lyrics by Jon Hendricks